Moisés Gosálvez (born 13 January 1960) is a Spanish former backstroke swimmer who competed in the 1980 Summer Olympics.

References

1960 births
Living people
Spanish male backstroke swimmers
Olympic swimmers of Spain
Swimmers at the 1980 Summer Olympics